The 1999 Women's Professional Softball League season was the third season of professional fastpitch softball for the league named Women's Professional Softball League (WPSL).  In 1997 and 1998, WPSL operated under the name Women's Pro Fastpitch (WPF).

Milestones and Events

After the 1998 season, the WPF (Women's Pro Fastpitch) changed its name to Women's Professional Softball League season (WPSL).  WPSL Commissioner/CEO John Carroll said the change should improve the league's name recognition, as "The term 'softball' is more readily recognized by our mass audience than the
term 'fastpitch'," Carroll said. "We believe the name change will result in higher public recognition. It will allow people to identify with the sport we play, rather than our style of play."  Also, two-time WPF Champion Orlando Wahoos folded, and their roster was assigned to the expansion Akron Racers.

On December 22, Centenary College of Shreveport, LA softball coach Michael Bastian was hired as the full-time head coach of the Racers.
The other full-time WPSL coaches were Willie Rucker for the Carolina Diamonds, Judy Martino for the Durham Dragons, Cindy Bristow for the Georgia Pride, Linda Derk for the Tampa Bay FireStix, and Terri Pearson for the Virginia Roadsters.

On March 23, the Durham Dragons introduced Bill Miller as general manager, replacing Dena Lambert.

The WPSL cancelled all preseason games, citing that many draft picks and free agents would be participating in the Women's College World Series.

On July 16, Georgia's Desarie Knipfer pitched the second perfect game in WPSL history, beating the Dragons 6-0.

Teams, cities and stadiums

Player Acquisition

College Draft

On December 5, 1998 the 1999 WPSL Senior Draft was held in St. Petersburg, Fla. The Durham Dragons selected 3B Isonette Polonius of East Carolina University with the first pick.

Notable Transactions

League standings 
Source:

WPSL Championship
The 1999 WPSL Championship Series was held at Firestone Stadium in Akron, Ohio August 24-8.  The top three teams on the standings qualified.  The second- and third-place teams, the Racers and Roadsters, played a best-of-three semifinal series.  The semifinal winner, the Racers, played the first-place team, the FireStix, in a best-of-three final series.

Annual awards
Source:

1999 WPSL All-Star Game

The 1999 WPSL All-Star Game  was played on June 13 in Plant City, FL at Plant City Stadium, televised on July 29 later on ESPN2.
The game feature 30 players split between two teams, one called the "WPSL Stars" and the other "WPSL Stripes." The Stars included players from the Akron Racers, Durham Dragons and Virginia Roadsters, and the Stripes were made up of Carolina Diamonds, Georgia Pride and Tampa Bay FireStix.

The WPSL Stars beat the WPSL Stripes by a score of a 5-4.  Roadsters catcher Scia Maumausolo hit a game-winning home run in the eighth inning and was named the game's Most Valuable Player.

Following are the All-Star rosters:

Statistical Leaders
Source:

Batting
BATTING TOP 10 (MINIMUM 158 PLATE APPEARANCES) 

HOME RUNS

RBI

STOLEN BASES

TEAM BATTING

HITS

DOUBLES

TRIPLES

ON-BASE PERCENTAGE

SLUGGING PERCENTAGE

EXTRA-BASE HITS

RUNS SCORED

Pitching
PITCHING TOP 10 (MINIMUM  66 IP)

WINS

SAVES

STRIKEOUTS

TEAM PITCHING

GAMES

COMPLETE GAMES

SHUTOUTS

INNINGS PITCHED

LOSSES

WALKS

HOME RUNS ALLOWED

References

External links

See also

 List of professional sports leagues
 List of professional sports teams in the United States and Canada

Softball teams
Softball in the United States
Pro Softball League season
Soft